Weymouthia is the scientific name of two genera of organism and may refer to:
 Weymouthia (plant), a genus of mosses
 Weymouthia (trilobite), a genus of trilobites